Plectorrhiza erecta , commonly known as the upright tangle orchid, is an epiphytic or lithophytic orchid that has many coarse, cord-like roots, many bright green leaves and up to five yellowish orange, cup-shaped flowers with purplish blotches. It grows close to the ground on fibrous barked plants and only occurs on Lord Howe Island.

Description
Flowering occurs from October to December.

Taxonomy and naming
The upright tangle orchid was first described in 1878 by Robert D. FitzGerald who gave it the name Cleisostoma erectum and published the description in his book Australian Orchids. In 1967 Alick Dockrill changed the name to Plectorrhiza erecta. The specific epithet (erecta) is a Latin word meaning "upright".

Distribution and habitat
Plectorrhiza erecta grows near the ground on the fibrous bark of trees and shrubs with its roots spreading over the bark, leaf litter and nearby rocks.

References

Aeridinae
Epiphytic orchids
Endemic orchids of Australia
Endemic flora of Lord Howe Island
Plants described in 1878
Taxa named by Robert D. FitzGerald